OE 36 is a class of 36 ft sailing yachts, designed in 1968 by Olle Enderlein (1917–1993), from whom the "OE" signature stems. The design is characteristic of the 1970s, with a distinct width at the middle of the hull, a narrow stern and bow, medium long fin keel and a skeg in front of the rudder.

A majority of the OE 36 yachts were co-built by the owners and professional boat builders at Sundsör Shipyard AB in Oxelösund, Sweden, where the builders rented the molds at the shipyard. As of 2008, the Swedish LYS handicap rating of the boat was 1.13.

Specification

Length overall: 11.07 m
Beam: 3.13 m
Draft: 1.80 m
Built: 1970-1983
Designer: Olle Enderlein (1917–1993)
Mainsail: 29.5 m2
Genoa: 42 m2
Spinnaker: 92 m2
Staysail: 15 m2
Weight: 5 800 kg
Keel: Fin keel, lead
Keel weight: 2 400 kg
Total built: 150
Years built: 1970-1983
Construction material: Glass-reinforced plastic

References

External links
OE Yacht Club of Scandinavia

Sailing yachts
1960s sailboat type designs
Sailboat type designs by Olle Enderlein